The 2021 Birmingham mayoral election was held on August 24, 2021, to elect the mayor of Birmingham, Alabama. Incumbent Democratic mayor Randall Woodfin was re-elected to a second term.

Background
Woodfin was first elected in 2017, defeating incumbent mayor William A. Bell in a runoff. He was a keynote speaker at the 2020 Democratic National Convention. During his first term, he faced criticism for furloughing some city employees during the COVID-19 pandemic, committing $3 million per year to the Protective Stadium, creating a city-funded scholarship program, and replacing Birmingham's police chief, though he has defended all the aforementioned decisions. In his reelection campaign, Woodfin primarily touted his accomplishments in renovating several dilapidated areas of the city and reforming the city's police department. A primary issue in the campaign was the results of the 2020 United States census, which showed that Huntsville had surpassed Birmingham as Alabama's most populous city. Woodfin believed that Birmingham's population loss was due to a brain drain, and pointed out that the aforementioned scholarship program could help keep high school graduates in the city.

Candidates

Confirmed
Cerissa Brown, mental health advocate
William A. Bell, former mayor
Napoleon Gonzalez
Philemon Hill, mechanical engineer and candidate for mayor in 2017
Lashunda Scales, President pro tempore of the Jefferson County commission
Darryl Williams, house refurbisher
Randall Woodfin, incumbent mayor
Chris Woods, businessman, former National Football League player, nephew of Abraham Woods, and candidate for mayor in 1995 and 2017

Endorsements

Polling

Debates

Results

Notes

References

External links
Official campaign websites
 Cerissa Brown for Mayor
 William A. Bell (D) for Mayor
 Lashunda Scales for Mayor
 Randall Woodfin (D) for Mayor
 Chris Woods for Mayor

Birmingham
Birmingham mayoral
2021